The Dubuisson-Neuhoff House is a historic mansion in Forest Hills, Tennessee, U.S..

History
The land was purchased from Edwin Warner, Percy Warner's brother, by John H. Dubuisson and Dorothy Neuhoff in 1938. The house was built in 1939, and designed in the International Style. It was the home of Dorothy's father, Henry Neuhoff, a German-born businessman who founded the Neuhoff Packing Company, a meatpacking company, and co-founded the German-American Bank of Nashville.

The house has been listed on the National Register of Historic Places since October 27, 2003.

References

Houses on the National Register of Historic Places in Tennessee
Houses completed in 1939
Houses in Davidson County, Tennessee
International style architecture in Tennessee